The 1983–84 Norwegian 1. Divisjon season was the 45th season of ice hockey in Norway. Eight teams participated in the league, and Sparta Sarpsborg won the championship.

Regular season

Playoffs

Relegation 
 Storhamar Ishockey - Strindheim IL 2:0 (10:1, 14:1)

External links 
 Norwegian Ice Hockey Federation

Nor
GET-ligaen seasons
1983 in Norwegian sport
1984 in Norwegian sport